Gustav Adolf von Wulffen (18 April 1878 – 4 May 1945) was a German highly decorated officer in the Wehrmacht with the rank of Generalmajor and SS-Officer with the rank of SS-Brigadeführer. He was decorated with the highest prussian decoration for bravery, Pour le Mérite on April 21, 1918 as Battalion Commander.

Early career

Von Wulffen was born on April 18, 1878 in Gotha as the son of German Imperial Army lieutenant general, Gustav Adolf Alexander Ferdinand von Wulffen and his wife Klara Wilhelmine Christiane Hauff. He studied at the Gymnasiums in Meiningen, Darmstadt and Frankfurt am Main, but was sent to the Cadet Corps, military school for boys in Potsdam, in March 1891. Von Wulffen later attended the Main Cadet Corps Academy in Berlin Groß-Lichterfelde and graduated in March 1897. He was commissioned Second lieutenant in Infanterie-Regiment “Graf Bose“ (1. Thüringisches) Nr. 31.

He was appointed battalions adjutant in his regiment in October 1902 and held this assignment until he was promoted to the capacity of regimental adjutant. Von Wulffen was promoted to the rank of first lieutenant in May 1907 and served in this capacity until his promotion to the rank of captain in October 1912. He was subsequently transferred to Breslau and appointed brigade adjutant in 22nd Infantry Brigade under Major General Karl Friedrich Surén.

World War I

Von Wulffen marched with the brigade to the field and participated in the combats in Belgium in August 1914 and later in the France during September and October of that year. He was transferred to Reserve-Infanterie-Regiment 271 in January 1915 and appointed commander of Feld-Battalion 26. Von Wulffen was transferred with his unit to the Eastern front and participated in the combats in Galicia until August 1916, when he was transferred to the staff of XXXX Reserve Corps under General of Infantry, Karl Litzmann as Corps Adjutant. For his service in the early phase of the World War I, von Wulffen was decorated with the both classes of Iron Cross.

In May 1917, Von Wulffen was transferred back to the Western Front and attached to Mecklenburgischen Grenadier-Regiments 89 as commander of II. Battalion. He led unit during the combats in West Flanders and participated in the Battle of Passchendaele. Von Wulffen was decorated with Knight's Cross of the Prussian House Order of Hohenzollern with Swords for his service in Flanders.

During the German spring offensive in early 1918, von Wulffen led his battalion during the heavy combats in Northern France and distinguished himself for bravery in action. He was decorated with the highest prussian decoration for bravery, Pour le Mérite on April 21, 1918. Von Wulffen also received both classes of Mecklenburg-Schwerin Military Merit Cross during his service with Grenadier Regiment 89.

Von Wulffen was transferred to the staff of Heeresgruppe Boehn under Colonel General Max von Boehn and served as Adjutant until he was promoted to the rank of major in October 1918 and transferred to the same capacity to the staff of XXVI Reserve Corps under General Oskar von Watter. He remained in that capacity until the end of War and retired from the Army on December 31, 1918.

Interwar period

After the war he worked as a salesman and became involved in right-wing politics by joining the Hamburger Nationalklub, a Hamburg-based group for rightist businessmen. Around this time he also took out membership in the Sturmabteilung and the Nazi Party. In June 1933 he was one of only three men hired by the newly established Office of the Deputy Führer. Von Wulffen was also director of Personnel Matters Department within Deputy Führer office.

Later switching to the Schutzstaffel he transferred to the staff of the Reichsführer-SS and eventually obtained the Brigadeführer in that organisation.

World War II

Von Wulffen was recalled to active service at the end of August 1939 with the temporary rank of colonel and attached to the General staff of Ground Army in Berlin. He was subsequently transferred to the Army Ground Training Center in Zossen and held temporary command of the center for almost two weeks. Von Wulffen was subsequently transferred to Potsdam and assumed command of local Army Garrison. He was promoted to the permanent rank of colonel in February 1941.

He held this assignment for the duration of the war and was promoted to the rank of Generalmajor in March 1942. Von Wulffen also received both classes of War Merit Cross with swords for his service in that capacity. In April 1945, Von Wulffen assumed command of mixed combat group consisted from units of his garrison and other army units. He was severely wounded during the combats with allied troops and died in field hospital on May 4, 1945.

Decorations
 Pour le Mérite: April 21, 1918
 Knight's Cross of the Prussian House Order of Hohenzollern with Swords: October 8, 1917
 Iron Cross (1914) 
 2nd Class 
 1st Class
 Mecklenburg-Schwerin Military Merit Cross
 2nd Class 
 1st Class
 Wound Badge in Silver
 Honour Cross of the World War 1914/1918
 NSDAP Service Decoration in Bronze
 SS-Ehrenring
 War Merit Cross with Swords
 2nd Class: December 24, 1940 
 1st Class: September 1, 1943

See also
List SS-Brigadeführer

References

External link

1878 births
1945 deaths
German Army personnel of World War I
Recipients of the Pour le Mérite (military class)
Sturmabteilung officers
Officials of Nazi Germany
SS-Brigadeführer
German Army personnel killed in World War II
Major generals of the German Army (Wehrmacht)
People from Gotha (town)
People from Saxe-Coburg and Gotha
German Army generals of World War II
Military personnel from Thuringia